Ida Sargent (born January 25, 1988) is an American cross-country skier. Sargent competed at the 2014 Winter Olympics in Sochi, Russia.

Cross-country skiing results
All results are sourced from the International Ski Federation (FIS).

Olympic Games

World Championships

World Cup

Season standings

Individual podiums
1 podium – (1 )

Team podiums
 2 podiums – (2 )

References

External links 
 
 
 
 

1988 births
Living people
American female cross-country skiers
Cross-country skiers at the 2014 Winter Olympics
Cross-country skiers at the 2018 Winter Olympics
Olympic cross-country skiers of the United States
Sportspeople from Vermont
21st-century American women